The House of Trubetskoy (English), Трубецкие (Russian), Трубяцкі (Belarusian), Trubecki (Polish), Trubetsky (Ruthenian), Трубецький (Ukrainian), Troubetzkoy (French), Trubic (Croatian),  Trubetski (Estonian), Trubezkoi or Trubetzkoy (German), is a Russian gentry family of Ruthenian stock and Lithuanian origin, like many other princely houses of Grand Duchy of Lithuania, later prominent in Russian history, science, and arts. They are descended from Algirdas's son Demetrius I Starshy (1327 – 12 August 1399 (the Battle of the Vorskla River)). They used the Pogoń Litewska coat of arms and the Trubetsky coat of arms.

Sovereign rule
Princes Troubetzkoy descend from Demetrius I Starshy, one of Algirdas's sons, who ruled the towns of Bryansk and Starodub. He was killed together with his elder sons in the Battle of the Vorskla River (1399). Demetrius's descendants continued to rule the town of Trubetsk (Troubchevsk) until the 1530s, when they had to convert to Roman Catholicism or leave their patrimony and settle in Moscow. They chose the latter, and were accepted with great ceremony at the court of Vasili III of Russia.

Time of Troubles

Undoubtedly, the most prominent of early Troubetzkoys was Prince Dmitry Timofeievich Troubetzkoy, who helped Prince Dmitry Pozharsky to raise a volunteer army and deliver Moscow from the Poles in 1612. The Time of Troubles over, Dmitry was addressed by people as "Liberator of the Motherland" and asked to accept the Tsar's throne. He contented himself, however, with the governorship of Siberia and the title of the Duke (derzhavets) of Shenkursk. Prince Dmitry died on May 24, 1625 and was interred in the Trinity Lavra of St. Sergius.

Quite different was a stance of his first cousin, Prince Wigund-Jeronym Troubetzkoy. He supported the Poles and followed them to Polish–Lithuanian Commonwealth after the Time of Troubles. Here his descendants were given enviable positions at the court and married into other princely families of Poland. By the 1660s, however, the only Troubetzkoy left, Prince Yuriy Troubetzkoy, returned to Moscow and was given a boyar title by Tsar Alexis of Russia of the House of Romanov. All the branches of the family descend from his marriage to Princess Irina Galitzina.

Members

 Prince Alexis S. Troubetzkoy, 1934–2017, historian, educator
 Princess Amélie Rives Troubetzkoy, 1863–1945, American novelist, poet, playwright, married to Prince Pierre Troubetzkoy, artist (1864-1936)
 Prince Dmitrii Timofeyevich Troubetzkoy, d. 1625, Savior of the Motherland during the Time of Troubles
 Prince Evgenii Nikolaevitch Troubetzkoy, 1863-1920, religious philosopher, professor, publicist, lawyer, public figure.
 Prince Igor Nikolayevich Troubetzkoy (Moscow, 23 August 1912, Paris, France – 20 December 2008), driver of the first Ferrari to compete in Grand Prix motor racing. Fourth husband of the American heiress Barbara Hutton.
 Prince Ivan Yurievich Trubetskoy, 1667–1750, Russian field marshal, Boyar
 Prince Nikita Yurievich Trubetskoy, 1699–1767, Russian statesman, Field Marshal
 Prince Nikolai Sergeyevich Troubetzkoy (Moscow, April 16, 1890 – Vienna, June 25, 1938) Russian linguist, historian.
 Prince Nikolai Petrovitch Troubetzkoy, 1828–1900, father of Sergei Nikolaevich Trubetskoy and Evgenii Nikolaevitch Troubetzkoy, Co-founder and Chairman of the Russian Musical Society in Moscow, co-founder of the Moscow Conservatory
 Prince Paolo Troubetzkoy (Intra, Italy, 15 February 1866 – Pallanza, 12 February 1938), artist, sculptor
 Prince Pyotr Petrovich Troubetzkoy, 1822–1892, Russian diplomat, botanist, father of Paolo Troubetzkoy and Pierre Troubetzkoy.
 Prince Pierre Troubetzkoy (1864-1936), artist
 Prince Sergei Nikolaevich Trubetskoy, 1862–1905, Russian religious philosopher, first elected Rector of Moscow University
 Prince Sergei Petrovich Troubetzkoy, August 29, 1790 – November 22, 1860, Decembrist
 Wladimir Troubetzkoy, 10 October 1942 – 2 June 2009, French literary historian
 Prince Youcca Troubetzkoy, also Nicolas Barclay, George Fairwood, (December 12, 1905 – April 22, 1992) French-American actor.
 Prince Yuriy Petrovich Trubetskoy, 1643–1679, Ruthenian prince, Boyar
 Prince Yuri Yurievich Trubetzkoy, 1668–1739, Russian General, Senator

References

External links
 
 ОЛЬГЕРДОВИЧІ. ДМИТРОВИЧІ. ТРУБЕЦЬКІ
 Scylla Trubecka
 Troubetzkoy genealogy
 Die Stammesgeschichte der Trubezkoi bei Russianfamily.ru

 
Russian noble families